The 2010 NASCAR Mini Stock Series season was the second to be run under this name. It is the feeder division of the NASCAR Corona Series.

Cars
The Nissan made his NASCAR debut in the 2010 NASCAR Mini Stock Series' season.

Drivers

Calendar

Results

Races

Standings

(key) Bold - Pole position awarded by time. Italics - Pole position set by final practice results or rainout. * – Most laps led.

Only the best 11 results counted for the championship.

See also

2010 NASCAR Sprint Cup Series
2010 NASCAR Nationwide Series
2010 NASCAR Camping World Truck Series
2010 NASCAR Canadian Tire Series
2010 NASCAR Corona Series

References

NASCAR Mini Stocks Series season

NASCAR Mexico Series